Operation Hornung was an anti-partisan operation during the Occupation of Belarus by Nazi Germany, carried out in February 1943. It was directed against the area Hancewicze-Morocz-Lenin-Łuniniec, a thinly populated area of about 4,000 square kilometers southwest of Słuck on the southern border of the Regional Commissariat White Ruthenia. It came in the sequence of three actions (including Erntefest I and Erntefest II) that had taken place in January further to the northeast, in the area of Słuck-Osipowicze; it claimed over 12,000 victims.

Background
The aim of this operation, carried out by Curt von Gottberg, was to prevent any further advance of partisans from the northern Polesie region who had entered the Regional Commissariat White Ruthenia and the Reichskommissariat Ukraine, from the east and to prevent  damage to the Brześć-Homel railway along the Prypeć River; domination of this area was of key importance. According to the reconnaissance reports of the commander of Sicherheitspolizei and SD Minsk, a careful estimate suggested a population of 10,000 people and a number of 'bandits', a total in the order of 34,000 men. Allegedly, there existed a veritable Soviet republic with command offices, centers of recruitment and the military training of young men; also, new sports arenas, churches and schools. The population of the area was from the start saddled with collective liability and its extermination was planned. 'Given the current weather it must be expected that in all villages of the mentioned area the bandits have found shelter', was the feeble justification of the Dirlewanger Special Battalion. Two members of a propaganda company sent as observers, put it rather more clearly: In order to keep the bands from once more gaining a foothold in this area, the order had been issued to turn this area into a no mans land.

The operation
The preamble of Operation Hornung was the destruction of the Słuck ghetto on February 8, 1943 by the almost completely employed unit of the commander of security police and SD Minsk with the help of several other police units. They murdered more than 3,000 people there. Within the following week, the area of the operation was concentrically crossed by 13 battalions and numerous smaller units of the participating forces in five combat groups. The population, which was to be murdered at the end of the operation, was pacified with the assurance that only actual partisans were being targeted. But there was hardly any fighting. On February 14/15, the tactic was changed, as had been established already before the operation, and the last and in this case longest phase began. The wounded Oskar Dirlewanger was replaced by Franz Magill, the deputy commander of Special Battalion Dirlewanger, who issued the following order:

Combat Group Binz of Police Regiment 23 (SS-Polizei Regiment 23) issued the following radio message:

The order had not been issued by a major of the Schutzpolizei, (gendarmerie), Siegfried Binz, however, but at a higher level. At first there had been a total collection of agricultural products for the final phase of the operation, which boded no good for the population. All participating combat groups in the operation area adopted this procedure, not only Combat Group Binz. Last but not least, Erich von dem Bach-Zelewski, according to his own statements, arrived at the (Headquarters of?) Combat Group Staff von Gottberg on February 15 probably a day earlier, and thus in time to give the order himself or at least be present when it was issued. Until then, apart from the Jews of Słuck, 2,483 people had been killed. This was also one of the first operations in which the SS-Special Battalion Dirlewanger took part since Bach-Zelewski had put it at von Gottberg's disposal. Its deputy commander, Magill, was head of SS for special tasks at Bach-Zelewski's staff and had been specifically detached to von Gottberg. Magill thus had the chance to continue in this region what he had already begun with the SS Cavalry Regiment 2 in 1941. Other units taking part in Operation Hornung included a detachment of Einsatzgruppe B with the collaboration of the Rodionov battalion, which in turn came from the rear area of Army Group Centre and was noted for its brutality. The contemporary Wehrmacht commander in White Ruthenia, Bronislaw Pawel, stated that the immediate direction of the operation had been carried out by von Gottberg but that 
the overall direction had resided with Bach-Zelewski.

Extermination
There are several sources and accounts for the ensuing extermination campaign. Two Wehrmacht propagandists reported the attempt to turn this area into no mans land: This was carried out by slaughtering the population of the villages and farms located in this area down to the last infant. All houses were burned down. Cattle and food stocks were collected and taken out of the area. They also mentioned the panic that had spread, even among the hardened Belarusian auxiliary policemen, who still spoke about it months thereafter:

Descriptions of German cruelty, for instance cramming women and children into burning houses, spread rapidly among the civilian population.

Survivors from this region have movingly described how they felt when placed inside a dead zone. Gana Michalowna Grincewicz remembered: In my fear it seemed to me that no one was left in the world, that all had been killed.

This action stands out for the extermination of many large villages by the Germans. 1,046 people died in Lenin, 780 in Pusiczi, 787 in Adamowo  and 426 in Kopacewiczi. A final total of 12,718 dead, among them 3,300 Jews, (from Słuck), were recorded. Only 65 prisoners were mentioned. Indeed, the SS and police deported only 72 people as a labor force in the course of fighting in the Regional Commissariat White Ruthenia in February 1943. Between November 1942 and March 1943, no more than 3,589 persons had been made available to the so-called Sauckel Commission in the course of eleven major operations, during which at least 33,378 people were murdered.

References 

Hornung
Hornung
Conflicts in 1943
Hornung
Reichskommissariat Ostland
Military history of Belarus during World War II